Leeuwenhoekiella nanhaiensis  is a Gram-negative, heterotrophic, rod-shaped and aerobic bacterium from the genus of Leeuwenhoekiella which has been isolated from deep-sea water from the South China Sea.

References

External links
Type strain of Leeuwenhoekiella nanhaiensis at BacDive -  the Bacterial Diversity Metadatabase

Flavobacteria
Bacteria described in 2016
Leeuwenhoekiella